Paraíso ("Paradise") is a 2003 Cuban/German film. It was directed by Alina Teodorescu.

Synopsis
Using a half road-movie, half documentary style, the film presents work and life of a Cuban band living in Guantanamo, Cuba. The film contains many music clips with well-done subtitles, as well as rehearsal work or live acts. In interview parts the musicians also explain how they develop their song concepts out of difficulties of daily life.

Cast
Yasel González Rivera 	

Gerald Thomas Collymore 	

Rafael Ocaña Creagh 	

Angel Rubio Espinoza 	

Yoannis Méndez Centeno

Musicians
Madera Limpia developed a unique mixture of hip hop / Rap lyrics accompanied by afro-Cuban rhythms and traditional music (e.g. Changui). This blend is often referred to as Latin Alternative or Rap Cubano. The band name ('clean wood') refers to driftwood used as very basic musical instruments.

They sing about youth with no real chances (Verdad Global), love affairs (e.g. Punto de Partida or Descarga Fula, which is about a girlfriend going away with a tourist), or growing crime and unsocial behaviour in their neighborhood (Sueño Canino - A dog's dream).

The band presented their music on a tour to Europe in 2005. After their first CD (Paraíso OST) they recorded one more international CD. In Cuba there are also several 'unofficial' or bootleg recordings circulating on the streets, containing more open lyrics than is possible in an official production. German Der Spiegel called their lyrics 'Widerstandspoesie' (resistance poetry).

Awards
The film gained several worldwide awards, mainly on Latin-American festivals, e.g.
 2004 German Cinematography Award - Editing Award Nomination
 2004 Premio independiente.doc - Asociacion de la Prensa de Cadiz
 2005 AluCine Toronto - Best Non-Latino documentary

References

External links
 
  Website of production company, with detailed notes and clips from the film
 Band review on NPR music

2003 films
Cuban documentary films
German documentary films
2000s Spanish-language films
2000s German films